Dmitri Petrovich Dyuzhev (born July 9, 1977) is a Russian film and stage actor and singer. In January 2023, Ukraine imposed sanctions on Dmitri for his support of 2022 Russian invasion of Ukraine.

Early life 
Was born on July 9, 1978 in Astrakhan, in the family of actor Petr Dyuzhev and Ludmila Dyuzheva. In 1995 he graduated the "School of Gifted Children" and entered the GITIS (Directing Department, acting group, workshop by Mark Zakharov). Dmitri played Donevan in Boris Godunov. Rehearsals coincided with the shooting of the television series Bayazet, in which Dyuzhev was invited for one of the main roles, but Dmitri declined to act in the series.

Career 
Dyuzhev debuted in film 24 Hours by Alexander Atanesyan in 2000.

Since 2006, Dmitry Dyuzhev is an actor of the Moscow Art Theatre. In 2011, Dyuzhev's debut as a director took place. After graduating from the High Courses for Scriptwriters and Film Directors, he completed his thesis work - a half-hour film Brothers, which participated in the Kinotavr program in the short films competition.

In 2015, Dmitry Dyuzhev made his debut as a theater director, staging the play Bench on the play of A. Gelman with the participation of actors: A. Khabarova and V. Lanskoy.

Sanctions 
In February 2023 Canada sanctioned Dmitri Dyuzhev for being involved in Russian propaganda and spreading misinformation relating to the 2022 war in Ukraine.

Personal life 
On February 14, 2008 Dmitri married Tatiana Dyuzheva, with a traditional Russian Orthodox ceremony held on July 20, 2008. Their son, Ivan, was born on 8 August 2008.

Selected filmography

Films
 Razborka v Manile (English title: Showdown in Manila) (Russia/Philippines, 2016) as Victor
 Beremennyy (English title: The Pregnant) (Russia, 2011) as Sergey Dobrolyubov
 Delo bylo na Kubani (Russia, 2011)
 Utomlyonnye solntsem 2: Tsitadel (English title: Burnt by the Sun 2: Citadel) (Russia, 2011) as Banya
 Lyubov' i zoloto (Russia, 2010) as Archaeologist
 Hamlet. XXI Century (Russia, 2010) as Claudius
 Blizkiy vrag (English title: Close Enemy) (Russia, 2010) as Oleg
 Moskva, ya lyublyu tebya! (Russia, 2010)
 Utomlyonnye solntsem 2: Predstoyanie (English title: Burnt by the Sun 2: Exodus) (Russia, 2010) as Banya
 Kanikuly strogogo rezhima (English title: High Security Vacation) (Russia, 2009) as Evgeni Koltsov
 Rokery (Russia, 2009)
 Obratnaya storona (English title: The Other Side) (Kazakhstan, 2009) as Bek
 Ischeznovenie (Russia/Ukraine, 2008)
 Zolotaya rybka (Russia, 2008) as Elvis
 Tarif Novogodniy (English title: The New Year's Rate Plan) (Russia, 2008) as Voditel' benzovoza
 Rozygrysh (Russia, 2008) as Aleksandr Ivanovich
 Svoj-Chuzhoj (Russia, 2008) as Matvej
 Kuka (Russia, 2007) as Roma
 Puteshestvie s domashnimi zhivotnymi (English title: Travelling with Pets) (Russia, 2007) as Sergei
 Antidur (Russia, 2007) as Vel'mishev
 Den pobedy (Russia, 2006) as Aleksei Privalov
 Mne ne bol'no (Russia, 2006) as Oleg
 Ostrov (English title: The Island) (Russia, 2006) as otets Iov
 Letuchaya mysh (Ukraine, 2005) as Al'fred
 Mechtat ne vredno (English title: To Dream Harmlessly) (Russia, 2005) as Andrian
 Zhmurki (English title: Dead Man's Bluff) (Russia, 2005) as Simon
 Russkoe (Russia, 2004) as Slavka
 Vsadnik po imeni Smert (English title: The Rider Named Death) (Russia, 2004) as Azef
 Slushatel (Russia, 2004) as Sidyachko
 Kovcheg (Russia, 2002)
 Aprel''' (Russia, 2002)
 Poisons or the World History of Poisoning (Яды, или Всемирная история отравлений, 2001) as Dr. Edme Costa 24 chasa (English title: 24 Hours) (Russia, 2000)

TelevisionThe Road to Calvary (Russia, 2017) as Mamont DalskyOsvoboditeli (Russia, 2010) as himselfVerbnoe voskresen'e (Russia, 2009) as ArturTy - eto ya (Russia, 2006)Karambol (Russia, 2006) as SlutskijSchastlivyy (Russia, 2005) as NikitaOhotniki za ikonami (Russia, 2005) as Moshennik Rubl'Samara-gorodok (Russia, 2004) as Nikita KhabarovKomanda (Russia, 2004) as Mark LevinStilet (Russia, 2003) as Security guard at the casinoNa uglu, u Patriarshih 3 (Russia, 2003)Rodina zhdet (English title: In the Service of My Country) (Russia, 2003) as Nikolai KavchuginSvetskie hroniki (Russia, 2002) as Photographer PetechkaBrigada (English title: Law of the Lawless) (Russia, 2002) as KosmosMarsh Turetskogo (Russia, 2000)

VoiceFantastic Journey to OZ (2017) as bear TopotunMonstry protiv prisheltsev (English title: Monsters vs Aliens) (USA, 2009) as The Missing LinkPro Fedota-streltsa, udalogo molodtsa (Russia, 2008) as GeneralLyagushachij raj (Russia, 2007)

Theatre
Moscow Art Theatre (2006–present):
2006 - Primadonny2009 - Dvoryanskoe gnezdo (English title: Home of the Gentry'')

References

External links 

 Kino-teatr.ru
 Kinopoisk.ru
 Ruskino.ru
 Kinomania.ru

1978 births
Living people
Russian male film actors
Russian male stage actors
Russian male television actors
Russian male voice actors
Russian Academy of Theatre Arts alumni
21st-century Russian singers
21st-century Russian male singers